The U.S. Open Clay Courts, known formally as the U.S. Clay Court Championships, was a national tennis championship for women that was sanctioned by the United States Tennis Association. The first edition was held in Pittsburgh, Pennsylvania in 1912, two years after the first men's championships, and was won by May Sutton. The final edition was held in 1986 and won by Steffi Graf. The tournament was not held in 1913, 1924–1939 and 1942. The doubles event was first held in 1914.

Nancy Richey and Chris Evert won more singles titles (6) at this tournament than any other woman.  Linda Tuero holds the record for runners-up in singles (3).

Locations
 1912: Pittsburgh, Pennsylvania
 1913: Not held
 1914: Cincinnati, Ohio (Cincinnati Tennis Club)
 1915: Pittsburgh, Pennsylvania (Pittsburgh Athletic Association)
 1916: Cleveland, Ohio (Lakewood Tennis Club)
 1917: Cincinnati, Ohio (Cincinnati Tennis Club)
 1918–19: Chicago, Illinois (South Side Tennis Club)
 1920: Detroit, Michigan (Detroit Tennis Club)
 1921–23: Buffalo, New York (Park Club)
 1924–39: Not held
 1940–41: River Forest, Illinois (River Forest Tennis Club)
 1942: Not held
 1943–44: Detroit, Michigan (Detroit Tennis Club)
 1947: Salt Lake City, Utah (Salt Lake Tennis Club)
 1948–54: River Forest, Illinois (River Forest Tennis Club)
 1955: Atlanta, Georgia (Bryan M. Grant, Jr. Tennis Center)
 1956–65: River Forest, Illinois (River Forest Tennis Club)
 1966–68: Milwaukee, Wisconsin (Town Club)
 1969–86: Indianapolis, Indiana (Indianapolis Racquet Club)

Results

Singles

Doubles

See also
 U.S. Men's Clay Court Championships
 U.S. Women's Indoor Championships

References

External links
WTA Tour history

Defunct tennis tournaments in the United States
Clay court tennis tournaments
WTA Tour
Women's tennis tournaments in the United States
Recurring sporting events established in 1912
Recurring events disestablished in 1986
1912 establishments in Pennsylvania